Hudek is a surname. Notable people with the surname include: 

John Hudek (born 1966), American baseball player
Sarah Hudek (born 1997), American softball player

See also
Hádek